Obolon Joint Stock Company is a major Ukrainian producer of beverages: beer, low alcohol drinks (cocktails), soda drinks and locally extracted natural mineral water, as well as a major malt producer. Based in Kyiv, Obolon JSC has sites across Ukraine and employs several thousand people.

Obolon's main plant in Kyiv is the largest brewing facility in Europe by installed capacity. , that facility was Europe's largest single beer manufacturer in terms of physical volume. Obolon's  plant in Khmelnytskyi Oblast is the largest malting facility in Europe by installed capacity.

History

The company's main brewery was built in 1980 according to designs made by Czech engineers, near an artesian well in Kyiv's Obolon district. Initially called Kyiv brewery #3, it acquired the name "Obolon" in 1986. In 1992, Obolon became the first privatized company in independent Ukraine and registered its corporate brand Obolon. The shares of company stock were distributed among its employees. In 1993, Obolon changed its legal status to a closed joint-stock company (currently it is a private joint stock company under present legislation). In 1997, Obolon obtained a $40 million loan from the European Bank for Reconstruction and Development, which the company used to significantly expand its production capacities.

In 2009 Obolon obtained a further $50 million loan from the European Bank for Reconstruction and Development towards financial stability and increased energy efficiency.

In 2011 Obolon is changing its form of ownership, becoming a public joint stock company. Molson Coors Brewing Company and Obolon Corporation announce commercial cooperation in Ukraine. This is how the legendary Carling beer appeared on the Ukrainian market. Obolon Corporation ranks 28th in the world in terms of beer production in 2010 and is the first exporter of beer to China.

Oleksandr Slobodian, the CEO and veteran of the company was also a national politician till the 2012 Ukrainian parliamentary election; he was a member of the Verkhovna Rada and has represented the conservative People's Movement of Ukraine for three consecutive sessions.

In 2020 Obolon celebrated its 40th anniversary. The corporation was included in the rankings of the top 25 innovative companies of Ukraine and the top 50 best companies by the end of the year. A large-scale renovation of Obolon TM and Zibert TM took place. New beers, cider ("Ciber Rose"), two new flavors of soft drinks TM "Zhyvchyk" were released, mineral water "Obolonskaya low-carbonated". The company was also the first in Ukraine to launch low-alcohol beverages new to the market in the category of "hard zeltser".

Structure
Obolon has its main site in Kyiv and 8 facilities in Ukraine:
 Bershad (Vinnytsia Oblast),
 Fastiv (Kyiv Oblast),
 Krasyliv and Chemerivtsi (Khmelnytskyi Oblast),
 Kolomyia (Ivano-Frankivsk Oblast)
 Oleksandria (Kirovohrad Oblast),
 Okhtyrka (Sumy Oblast)
 Rokytne (Rivne Oblast)
 Sevastopol.

Products and market share

Obolon sells beer under six brands: Obolon, Obolon BeerMix, Magnat, hike premium beer, Zibert and Desant. Brands for its non-alcoholic products are Zhyvchyk, Prozora and Obolonska mineral waters, and the Jett line of energy drinks. The enterprise also produces low-alcohol beverages, such as kvass. Obolon bottles Bitburger beer under license.

Obolon is the largest Ukrainian exporter of beer, accounting for 80% of Ukrainian beer exports. It was the first Ukrainian brewery to export to the United States. , the company exported to 33 countries. It started exporting beer to China in 2011. Prior to 2014, most exports were to Russia. In September 2014, Russia banned imports of Ukrainian beer over alleged inaccuracies in the nutrition information displayed on the products' labels. Early summer 2015 the company signed a licensing agreement with the Moscow Brewing Company to make beer inside Russia under its label, hence to re-enter the Russian beer market. In March 2022, the company withdrew from this agreement following Russia’s military invasion of Ukraine.

Quality standards
The Obolon Corporation has its own malting plant able to produce 120,000 tonnes of malt per year. The malting plant uses equipment from the German company Schmidt-Seeger. Obolon uses the malt in its own products and exports it.

Obolon is quality certified to international standards: ISO 9001:2001 (Quality Management Systems), ISO 22 000:2007 (Food Safety Management Systems), ISO 14 001:2006 (Environmental Management Systems), and OHSAS 18 001:2006 (Occupational Health and Safety Systems).

Social investments
The company invests in projects aimed at reducing adverse environmental impact. Obolon is also actively involved in educational projects, charitable and cultural initiatives. It has contributed to restoration of churches and monasteries and to publishing of Ukrainian books.

Sports patronage

Obolon has sponsored FC Obolon Kyiv since 1999. The company's CEO was an amateur footballer in his youth. On 21 February 2013 FC Obolon Kyiv withdrew voluntary from the Ukrainian First League after Obolon CEO Slobodyan had refused to finance the club after goalkeeper Kostyantyn Makhnovskyi was sold by the club without his consent. In December 2012 Slobodian announced he would create a new team under the moniker "Obolon Brovar" (Obolon Brewery). This club started its residence in competitive football in the 2013–14 Ukrainian Second League season.

See also
 Beer
 Economy of Ukraine

References

External links
  Official site of the company

 
Beer in Ukraine
Drink companies of Ukraine
Ukrainian brands
Obolonskyi District
Drink companies of the Soviet Union